is a Japanese four member reggae band. They are best known for their 2006 hit song , which was one of the top songs of 2006. They sold 2.5 million copies in Japan.

Biography 

The band's roots were first formed when Red Rice and Han-kun first performed together in Shōnan in central coastal Japan. Han-kun first formed an interest in reggae after by chance hearing Buju Banton's song "Untold Stories" in a friend's girlfriend's car, after coming home from a dance. Red Rice was a casual fan of reggae/hip-hop, until attending festivals which made him develop a great love of these genres. The pair met Shock Eye while performing, who previously worked as a hip-hop DJ. Shock Eye was friends with Wakadanna in high school, and met him again by chance in Shōnan. Wakadanna had been managing a reggae bar in Shōnan.

From 2001 onwards, the band worked together, having songs featured on compilation albums and collaborating with other artists. The band made their major label debut in 2003, under Toy's Factory.

The band's second album Shōnan no Kaze: Ragga Parade reached #5 on Oricon charts, after two top 20 singles. The band had a hit song in 2006, . It sold over 520,000 copies and was the 8th biggest hit of 2006. The follow-up album, Shōnan no Kaze: Riders High, reached #1.

The band has had other hits since then, such as "Ōgon Soul," "Koi Shigure" and "Gachi-zakura." The band's 4th album, Shōnan no Kaze: Joker, reached #1 on Oricon charts as well.

In 2012, the group provided the song "Born to be Wild" from their 2012 Entenka album for their first Yakuza title, for the final boss fight with Nozaki Ryo. The song is also part of the game's official soundtrack.

Han-kun released a solo-album in 2008. The band released the first of their planned "Best of" albums on March 6, 2013.

In 2013, the group provided the song "Just Live More" for the TV series Kamen Rider Gaim under the name .

In 2015, the group provided the opening song for their second Yakuza game Yakuza 0, titled "Bubble", and its ending, titled "Kurenai".

In 2016, the group provided the opening and closing themes "Ike! Tiger Mask" and "KING OF THE WILD" for the anime series Tiger Mask W.

In 2018, the group provided the opening theme for the anime series Grand Blue.

In 2020, the group then provided the opening song for their third Yakuza title Yakuza: Like a Dragon, titled "Ichibanka".

In 2022, the group collaborated with singer Koda Kumi with the song "Trust・Last", which was used as the opening theme to the Tokusatsu drama Kamen Rider Geats.

Discography

Studio albums 
 2003: Shōnan no Kaze: Real Riders
 2004: Shōnan no Kaze: Ragga Parade
 2006: Shōnan no Kaze: Riders High
 2009: Shōnan no Kaze: Joker

Compilation albums 
 2006: Massive B Meets Shōnan no Kaze: Osu!! Kyokutō Dancehall-han
 2007: 134°C Toketa Manma de Icchatte! Senkyoku Shōnan no Kaze
 2010: Shōnan no Kaze: Shōnan Bakuon Breaks! Mixed by the BK Sound by Shōnan no Kaze
 2013: Shōnan no Kaze ~Single Best~

References

External links 
 Official Site 
 Toy's Factory Label Site 

Japanese pop music groups
Musical quartets
Musical groups from Kanagawa Prefecture
Japanese reggae musical groups
Japanese boy bands